St Francis' Church on the corner of Lonsdale Street and Elizabeth Street, is the oldest Catholic church in Victoria, Australia. The main body of the church (with various later additions) is one of very few buildings in central Melbourne which was built before the Victorian gold rush of 1851.

History
On April 28, 1839 a committee of the Catholics at Port Philip, who customarily met for prayer in the house of Peter Bodecin, wrote Bede Polding, vicar-apostolic of New Holland, Van Diemen's Land and the adjoining islands, requesting a priest. Polding sent Father Patrick Geoghegan  O.F.M., who had arrived from Dublin the previous December. Geoghegan landed at Williamstown on May 15. He was the first resident Catholic priest in the Port Phillip District of New South Wales. 

The church's foundation stone was laid on 4 October 1841, the feast day of St Francis of Assisi, to whom the church is dedicated. The first mass was held in the completed nave on 22 May 1842. Mary MacKillop (1842–1909) was baptised at St Francis' Church in 1842. The completed church was blessed on 23 October 1845. 

In 1848, St Francis' became the cathedral church of the first Catholic Bishop of Melbourne, James Goold, and continued as a cathedral until 1868, when the diocesan seat was moved to the still unfinished St Patrick's Cathedral. The elegant cedar ceiling was installed in 1850. The ornate Ladye Chapel on the west side was designed by George and Schneider and constructed in 1856-58, with decoration by Le Gould and Souter. 

A new sanctuary designed by Reed and Barnes was added in 1878-9 in the Renaissance style. The front porch was added in 1956, incorporating the roof of a smaller porch added in the 1850s. At different times, various Catholic organizations have been based at St Francis’ Church.

Present day 
Centrally located in the Melbourne's CBD, St Francis' has never lost its place as one of the city's most popular and widely used churches, and today is the busiest church in Australia, with more than 10,000 worshippers attending each week. Since 1929, it has been a centre of Eucharistic Life in the care of the Congregation of the Blessed Sacrament. A monastery was constructed in the late 1930s.

The church is listed with Victorian Heritage Register, the National Trust of Australia (Victoria) and the Australian Heritage Commission. Although there have been many changes made to the building, including the erection of a new tower, a gift from the Grollo family, to house the original 1853 bell imported from Dublin, the church remains essentially as it was designed by Samuel Jackson.

References

External links
St Francis Church

Roman Catholic churches in Melbourne
Elizabeth Street, Melbourne
Buildings and structures in Melbourne City Centre
Roman Catholic churches in Victoria (Australia)
Roman Catholic churches completed in 1845
19th-century Roman Catholic church buildings in Australia
1845 establishments in Australia
Heritage-listed buildings in Melbourne